Robert Hartman Joseph (born 20 January 1982) is an Antiguan-born English former professional cricketer.

Joseph made his debut for Kent County Cricket Club at the end of the 2005 season, having been cleared to play for them in April 2004. In 2008 he took 55 County Championship wickets and was selected to tour India with the England performance squad. He left Kent following the 2011 season and subsequently joined Leicestershire on a short-term deal. Joseph re-signed for Kent in April 2014 playing in six county championship matches during the season.

He retired from top-class professional cricket after his second stint with Kent, playing club cricket with Hertford Cricket Club for a time before spending time as the performance coach of Cricket Namibia. In March 2018 he moved to Norfolk to become player-coach of Ashmanhaugh and Barton Wanderers Cricket Club, playing in Division Two of the Norfolk Alliance league.

He is the cousin of West Indian Test cricketer Sylvester Joseph.

References

External links

1982 births
Living people
English cricketers
Kent cricketers
Leeward Islands cricketers
Leicestershire cricketers
People educated at Sutton Valence School
Antigua and Barbuda cricketers
Antigua and Barbuda emigrants to England
First-Class Counties Select XI cricketers